Stara Wieś (literally old village in Polish) may refer to the following places in Poland:

Stara Wieś, Silesian Voivodeship (south Poland)
Stara Wieś, Podkarpackie Voivodeship (south-east Poland)
Stara Wieś, Subcarpathian Voivodeship (south-east Poland)
Stara Wieś, Aleksandrów County in Kuyavian-Pomeranian Voivodeship (north-central Poland)
Stara Wieś, Inowrocław County in Kuyavian-Pomeranian Voivodeship (north-central Poland)
Stara Wieś, Biłgoraj County in Lublin Voivodeship (east Poland)
Stara Wieś, Chełm County in Lublin Voivodeship (east Poland)
Stara Wieś, Hrubieszów County in Lublin Voivodeship (east Poland)
Stara Wieś, Krasnystaw County in Lublin Voivodeship (east Poland)
Stara Wieś, Gmina Krośniewice in Łódź Voivodeship (central Poland)
Stara Wieś, Gmina Kutno in Łódź Voivodeship (central Poland)
Stara Wieś, Piotrków County in Łódź Voivodeship (central Poland)
Stara Wieś, Radomsko County in Łódź Voivodeship (central Poland)
Stara Wieś, Rawa County in Łódź Voivodeship (central Poland)
Stara Wieś, Sieradz County in Łódź Voivodeship (central Poland)
Stara Wieś, Gmina Łęczna in Lublin Voivodeship (east Poland)
Stara Wieś, Gmina Puchaczów in Lublin Voivodeship (east Poland)
Stara Wieś, Puławy County in Lublin Voivodeship (east Poland)
Stara Wieś, Radzyń Podlaski County in Lublin Voivodeship (east Poland)
Stara Wieś, Limanowa County in Lesser Poland Voivodeship (south Poland)
Stara Wieś, Miechów County in Lesser Poland Voivodeship (south Poland)
Stara Wieś, Nowy Sącz County in Lesser Poland Voivodeship (south Poland)
Stara Wieś, Białobrzegi County in Masovian Voivodeship (east-central Poland)
Stara Wieś, Grójec County in Masovian Voivodeship (east-central Poland)
Stara Wieś, Lipsko County in Masovian Voivodeship (east-central Poland)
Stara Wieś, Mińsk County in Masovian Voivodeship (east-central Poland)
Stara Wieś, Otwock County in Masovian Voivodeship (east-central Poland)
Stara Wieś, Piaseczno County in Masovian Voivodeship (east-central Poland)
Stara Wieś, Pruszków County in Masovian Voivodeship (east-central Poland)
Stara Wieś, Przasnysz County in Masovian Voivodeship (east-central Poland)
Stara Wieś, Siedlce County in Masovian Voivodeship (east-central Poland)
Stara Wieś, Żyrardów County in Masovian Voivodeship (east-central Poland)
Stara Wieś, Lubusz Voivodeship (west Poland)
Stara Wieś, Pomeranian Voivodeship (north Poland)
Stara Wieś, Pszczyna in Silesian Voivodeship (south Poland)
Stara Wieś, Opole Voivodeship (southwest Poland)